The Amsterdam Rainbow Dress is a dress made of more than 70 flags of nations where homosexuality is illegal, commemorating LGBT+ victims of persecution. The dress has a diameter of 52 feet and has been displayed in San Francisco, Cape Town, and Ottawa, among other cities.

Icesis Couture and Lola Rodríguez have modeled the dress.

See also
 List of individual dresses

References

Individual dresses
LGBT symbols
Multicolor dresses